The athletics competition at the Africa Military Games was held from 24–26 April 2002 at the Moi International Sports Centre in Nairobi, Kenya.

A total of twenty-six events were contested, eighteen by men and eight by women. A near full track and field programme was held for men, with all regular track events being held and only the pole vault and hammer throw missing from the field events. The women's programme had limited entries so was mostly track running events, plus the long jump and high jump. No road or combined events were contested. All performances were affected by the high altitude of Nairobi.

The hosts, Kenya, were dominant at the competition, winning seventeen of the 26 gold medals on offer, including all but three of the track titles. The next most successful nation was Morocco, which won three gold medals and four silvers, having particular success in the women's section. Botswana took three golds in the men's events and also had the third largest medal haul at five. Military athletes from thirteen nations reached the podium.

Kenya provided the foremost international athletes at the meeting. The 2000 Sydney Olympics champion Noah Ngeny took the 800 metres title. Olympic medallist and former world champion Wilson Boit Kipketer easily won the 3000 metres steeplechase. Multiple world cross country medallist Paul Malakwen Kosgei was beaten  to the 10,000 metres gold by John Cheruiyot Korir – a situation that was reversed at the 2002 African Championships in Athletics later that year. The 5000 metres winner Sammy Kipketer later established himself globally with another win at the 2002 Commonwealth Games.

The women's competition was of a lower standard, with the most prominent international athlete being 1500 m winner Naomi Mugo, who formerly won a middle-distance double at the African Championships in Athletics. The reigning 800 m Mediterranean Games champion Seltana Aït Hammou was also present and won her speciality. IAAF World Cross Country Championships participants Restituta Joseph, Anna Ndege and Olympian Nebiat Habtemariam were other globally established athletes to medal at the Africa Military Games.

The most successful athletes in the competition were Jacinta Wambui and David Kirui, both of Kenya and both winners of a 200 metres/400 metres sprint double.

Medal summary

Men

Women

Medal table

See also
2002 in athletics (track and field)

References

Medallists
Africa Military Games. GBR Athletics. Retrieved on 2015-01-30.

Africa Military Games
Africa Military Games
Africa Military Games athletics
Africa Military Games
Africa Military Games Athletics